The Vault of Horror may refer to:
The Vault of Horror (comics), an American horror comic
The Vault of Horror (book), a collection of eight horror comic stories
The Vault of Horror (film), a 1973 British horror film